:Category:Physics textbooks
 List of textbooks on classical mechanics and quantum mechanics
 List of textbooks in electromagnetism
 List of textbooks in thermodynamics and statistical mechanics

Lists of science textbooks
Physics-related lists